Aisby is a village in the civil parish of Heydour, in the South Kesteven district of Lincolnshire, England.

Aisby is written in the Domesday Book as "Asebi".

Once a small hamlet belonging to the nearby Culverthorpe Estate, the village was sold off in lots in 1918 and is now expanded with additional building of housing since 1990. Aisby has other spellings in official records, including censuses, such as "Azeby" or "Hazeby".

References

External links
 

Villages in Lincolnshire
South Kesteven District